Akpınar is a village in the Besni District, Adıyaman Province, Turkey. Its population is 340 (2021).

The hamlet of Aşağıburunçayır is attached to the village.

References

Villages in Besni District